Energy in Ivory Coast has a capacity of 2,200 megawatts (MW) energy production. Unlike other countries in sub-Saharan Africa, the Ivory Coast reliable power supply in the region, exporting electricity to neighboring Ghana, Burkina Faso, Benin, Togo, and Mali. Ivory Coast aims to produce enough renewable energy by 2030 to reduce its greenhouse gas emissions by 28%.

Solar energy 
Ivory Coast aims to reach 400 MW in generating capacity from solar power by 2030. The country is building the Boundiali Solar Power Station, which will have a capacity of 37.5 megawatt-peak (MWp).

See also 
 List of power stations in Ivory Coast

References

External links
Map of the oil and gas infrastructure offshore Ivory Coast

 
Petroleum industry in Ivory Coast